Liptena evanescens, the pink liptena, is a butterfly in the family Lycaenidae. It is found in eastern Ivory Coast, Ghana, Nigeria (south and the Cross River loop), Cameroon, Bioko, Sao Tome and Gabon. The habitat consists of forests.

References

Butterflies described in 1887
Liptena
Butterflies of Africa
Taxa named by William Forsell Kirby